Ski Mountain Park is an artificial ski park located in Sao Roque in the state of São Paulo, Brazil. It is considered the largest artificial mountain entertainment center in Latin America.

External links
Ski Mountain Park website

Sports venues in São Paulo (state)
Ski areas and resorts in Brazil
Artificial ski resorts